Sar Asiab-e Yusefi (also Romanized as Sar Āsīāb-e Yūsefī; also known as Sar Āsīāb) is a village in Sar Asiab-e Yusefi Rural District, Bahmai-ye Garmsiri District, Bahmai County, Kohgiluyeh and Boyer-Ahmad Province, Iran. At the 2006 census, its population was 1,015, in 191 families.

References 

Populated places in Bahmai County